The 1904 University of Utah football team was an American football team that represented the University of Utah as an independent during the 1904 college football season. In its first season under head coach Joe Maddock, the team compiled a 7–1 record, shut out six of eight opponents, and outscored all opponents by a total of 301 to 38. Quarterback Jimmy Wade was the team captain.

The team's 107 points against Fort Douglas was a school record at the time and remains the second-highest point total in school history.

On November 19, 1904, Fred Bennion kicked a 55-yard field goal that was a school record until 1971.

Coach Maddock had been a star tackle on Michigan's 1902 and 1903 Point-a-Minute teams. Maddock was hired in February 1904 by University of Utah president Kingsbury upon the recommendation of Michigan coach Fielding H. Yost. Maddock was promised "complete control" of the Utah football team after graduating from Michigan in June. Maddock arrived in Salt Lake City to begin his coaching responsibilities on September 10, 1904.

Schedule

References

University of Utah
Utah Utes football seasons
University of Utah football